Bi Gan (毕赣, born 4 June 1989) is a Chinese film director, screenwriter, poet, and photographer. He was born in Kaili City, Guizhou.  His first feature film, Kaili Blues, was released in 2015 and won Best New Film Director at the 52nd Golden Horse Awards, the FIPRESCI Prize, The Golden Montgolfiere Prize at the 37th Festival of the Three Continents in Nantes, and the Best First Feature Film Award at The 68th Locarno Film Festival.

Biography
Bi Gan was born in Kaili City in Guizhou Province in June 1989. He is an ethnic Miao.

During his college years, Bi watched Andrei Tarkovsky's Stalker, later stating in an interview, "Cinema can be different [from mainstream films]; you can make what you like. What I had seen up to that point were mainly Hollywood films. What I was taught was pretty boring." Because of this particular film, he made up his mind to pursue filmmaking. "Before that, my parents and my relatives thought I would become jobless after graduation since I didn't want to do anything."

Filmmaking career
In 2010 he made the short fiction film South, which won the first prize at the university-sponsored "Guang Sui Ying Dong" (Light Follows the Motion of Shadow) Film Festival.

Two years later in 2012, he made a black-and-white short film Diamond Sutra (also known as The Poet and Singer), which features a story of murder in a small isolated town in the mountain. The film received Special Mention Award from the 19th Hong Kong ifva (Incubator for Film and Visual media in Asia), an award organized by Hong Kong Arts Centre, and was ranked top 10 at the 9th China Independent Film Festival in Nanjing, China.

In 2015, Bi's debut feature film, Kaili Blues, written by himself, gave the emerging director wider exposure. The film also garnered the Best New Film Director at the 52nd Golden Horse Awards, the FIPRESCI Prize, the Golden Montgolfiere Prize at the 37th Festival of the Three Continents in Nantes, and the Best First Feature Film Award at the 68th Locarno Film Festival.

In 2017, Bi wrote and directed his second feature film Long Day's Journey into Night, starring Tang Wei, Huang Jue, Sylvia Chang, and Lee Hong-chi. The film is also based in Guizhou Province and was released in 2018.

Filmography
 South (short) (2010)
 Tiger (2011)
 Diamond Sutra or The Poet and Singer (short) (2012)
 Kaili Blues (2015)
 Secret Goldfish (short) (2016)
 Long Day's Journey into Night (2018)
 A Short Story (short) (2022)

References

External links

1989 births
Living people
Miao people
Film directors from Guizhou
Screenwriters from Guizhou
People's Republic of China poets
People from Qiandongnan
Poets from Guizhou